Manuela Schmermund (born 30 December 1971) is a German Paralympic sport shooter.

Schmermund has paraplegia which was caused by damage to her spinal cord in a car accident in 1992. She competes in SH1 classification events.

She has competed at the Paralympic Games in 2000; in 2004, where she won a gold medal in the 10 metre air rifle standing SH1 event and a bronze medal in the 50 metre rifle 3 positions SH1 event; in 2008, where she won a silver medal in the 10 metre air rifle standing SH1 event; in 2012, where she won a silver medal in the 10 metre air rifle standing SH1 event; and in 2016.

References

External links
 

1971 births
Living people
German female sport shooters
Paralympic shooters of Germany
Paralympic rifle shooters
Paralympic medalists in shooting
Paralympic gold medalists for Germany
Paralympic silver medalists for Germany
Paralympic bronze medalists for Germany
Shooters at the 2000 Summer Paralympics
Shooters at the 2004 Summer Paralympics
Shooters at the 2008 Summer Paralympics
Shooters at the 2012 Summer Paralympics
Shooters at the 2016 Summer Paralympics
Medalists at the 2004 Summer Paralympics
Medalists at the 2008 Summer Paralympics
Medalists at the 2012 Summer Paralympics
People with paraplegia
Sportspeople from Kassel (region)
People from Hersfeld-Rotenburg
21st-century German women